Donald William Simmons  (14 February 1918 – 28 August 1986) was an Australian politician who represented the South Australian House of Assembly seat of Peake from 1970 to 1979 for the Labor Party.

References

 

1918 births
1986 deaths
Members of the South Australian House of Assembly
Australian Labor Party members of the Parliament of South Australia
20th-century Australian politicians
Members of the Order of Australia